Golden Mile or The Golden Mile may refer to:

Geographical features 

 Golden Mile (Belfast), Belfast, Northern Ireland, United Kingdom (UK)
 Golden Mile (Blackpool), Blackpool, UK
 Golden Mile (Brentford), Brentford, UK

 Golden Mile (Leicester), Leicester, UK
 Golden Mile (Moscow), Khamovniki District, Moscow, Russia
 Golden Mile, Canterbury, Victoria, Australia
 Golden Mile (Kalgoorlie), Kalgoorlie, Western Australia, Australia

 Golden Mile (Durban), Durban, South Africa
 Golden Mile, Toronto, Scarborough, Toronto, Ontario, Canada
 Golden Mile (Rhineland-Palatinate), a fertile plain near Remagen, Germany

 Golden Mile (Ontario), the former Highway 7, now London Line 22 in Sarnia, Ontario
 The Golden Mile, a section of the Baltimore Pike in Springfield Township, Delaware County, Pennsylvania
 Golden Mile District, Hato Rey, San Juan, Puerto Rico
 Nathan Road, Kowloon, Hong Kong
 Golden Mile Project (Vijayawada), India's longest smart street on M.G. Road

Other uses 
 Golden Mile (POW camp), a US POW camp in Germany in World War II
 IAAF Golden Mile, a series of mile races from 1978 to 1981
 Underbelly: The Golden Mile, the third part of the Australian television series, set in Kings Cross
 The Golden Mile, a 1989 album by Workshy
 The Golden Mile, a 1996 album by UK band My Life Story
 The Golden Mile, a 2008 album by Welsh band The Peth
 The Golden Mile, a 2010 novel by Martin Cruz Smith
 The Golden Mile (angling), a term used by Recreational Sea Anglers (RSAs)
 The Golden Mile, a fictional pub crawl path used by the main characters in the 2013 film The World's End.